There are a number of events held annually in Boston, Massachusetts, in the USA. They include:

Events

January

February

March

April

May

June

July

August

September

October

November

December

See also
Culture in Boston
Massachusetts culture
Public holidays in the United States

References

 
Annual
Boston
Boston